This is a list of lists of schools, sorted by country. The list does not include educational institutions providing higher education, meaning tertiary, quaternary, or post-secondary education, for which see list of colleges and universities by country.

Africa

List of schools in Angola

List of schools in Botswana

List of schools in Egypt

List of schools in Eswatini

List of schools in Ethiopia

List of schools in the Gambia

List of schools in Ghana

List of senior high schools in Ghana

List of schools in Guinea

List of schools in Kenya

List of schools in Lesotho

List of schools in Liberia

List of schools in Libya

List of schools in Mali

List of schools in Mauritius

List of secondary schools in Mauritius

List of schools in Namibia

List of schools in Nigeria

List of schools in Rwanda

List of schools in Somalia

List of schools in South Africa

List of schools in Sudan

List of schools in Tanzania

List of schools in Tunisia

List of schools in Uganda

List of schools in Zambia

List of schools in Zimbabwe

South America

List of schools in Argentina

List of schools in Brazil

List of schools in Colombia

List of high schools in Ecuador

List of schools in Guyana

List of schools in Paraguay

North America

North America

List of schools in Anguilla

List of schools in Bermuda

List of schools in the Cayman Islands

List of schools in Canada

List of schools in Mexico

List of schools in the United States

Caribbean

List of schools in Antigua and Barbuda

List of schools in Barbados

List of schools in the Dominican Republic

List of schools in Saint Kitts and Nevis

List of schools in Saint Lucia

List of schools in Trinidad and Tobago

Central America

List of schools in Honduras

List of schools in Nicaragua

Asia

Europe

Oceania

See also 
 Lists of schools

 
Education lists by country